The Railway Preservation Society of Ireland (RPSI) is an Irish railway preservation group operating throughout Ireland, founded in 1964. Mainline steam train railtours are operated from Dublin and Belfast, but occasionally from other locations as well. The society has bases in Dublin and Whitehead, County Antrim, with the latter hosting a museum and occasionally operating short steam rides within the confines of its site. The society owns heritage wagons, carriages, steam engines, diesel locomotives and metal-bodied carriages suitable for mainline use.

Bases
The society has developed several bases over time, with Whitehead joined by Sallins, then Mullingar, and also Inchicore and Connolly in Dublin.  As of 2019, three locations are in operation, Whitehead, Inchicore and Connolly.

Current operations

Whitehead site and museum
Whitehead, near Belfast, has a long history as an excursion station, and the RPSI developed a working steam and engineering depot there.  This was added to by the development of a museum.

The Whitehead Railway Museum opened without ceremony in early 2017, after a 5-year project to expand the site from a depot to include a rebuilt Whitehouse Excursion station and the museum. The total cost was £3.1m from various funding sources. The museum received 10,000 visitors in 2017, its first year, and 15,000 in 2018. The museum hosts five galleries and it is possible for visitors to see various heritage steam and diesel locomotives and observe work on railway carriage restoration. Guides from the society are present.

Inchicore, Dublin
The RPSI has arrangements for storage of stock at Inchicore Works with maintenance also being carried out there.

Connolly shed

Historic operations

Mullingar
The RPSI moved into the loco shed at Mullingar in 1974 and based steam locos 184 and 186 there. Carriages were also restored here. The base is now derelict with funding instead being channeled to Whitehead, including a council decision not to spend money on the green carriages based there. Generating Van 3173 was the last vehicle to be overhauled.

Prior to Mullingar, Sallins Goods Shed was used as a base.

Rolling stock

Steam locomotives

The Society possesses 9 steam locomotives (plus one more operated by them but owned by the Ulster Folk and Transport Museum), typically only a small number will be operational at any time:

Passenger tender locomotives
The RPSI has three Great Northern Railway of Ireland 's within its fleet.  No. 131, a Q class, was built in 1901.  The others are S class no. 171 Slieve Gullion and V class No. 85 Merlin, although the latter is owned by the Ulster Folk & Transport Museum and is on loan. These locomotives are suitable for longer distance main line work, but are speed restricted if they need to run tender-first in the event they cannot be turned.

Mixed large tank locomotive 
The RPSI's Northern Counties Committee (NCC) , WT class No. 4 holds significant records. It worked the last steam passenger train on Northern Ireland Railways, and with No. 53 operated the last stone goods train on 22 October 1970. Acquired by the RPSI in June 1971 it then went on to work over most of the remaining Irish railway network.
They also own a SLNCR Lough class.

Goods tender locomotives 
The Society possesses three goods tender locomotives all of which are suitable for slower speed passenger workings.  Two of these are from the 101 (J15) class, of which over 100 were built between 1866 and 1903 and which lasted until the end of the steam era on CIÉ in 1963.  The RPSI possesses two examples of these simple, reliable and robust engines, No. 184 with a saturated boiler and round-shaped firebox, and No. 186 with a superheated boiler and squarer Belpaire firebox.  No. 461, a  DSER 15 and 16 Class heavy goods locomotive, is the only Dublin and South Eastern Railway example that has been preserved.

Shunting locomotives
Shunting locomotives are useful and economical for shunting and short passenger work within Whitehead yard.  These include the  .3 'R.H. Smyth', affectionally known as Harvey, which has also been used ballast workings for NIR. There is also No3BG "Guinness", a Hudswell Clarke engine presented by Guinness to the Society in 1965.

Diesel and other locomotives

The RPSI has indicated it has a strategy to create a mainline heritage diesel fleet.  It has acquired four  65t  General Motors Bo-Bos; CIE 121 Class number 134 and CIE 141 Class numbers 141, 142 and 175.

The RPSI used to own two NIR 101 Class Hunslet diesels Numbered 101 and 102. They scrapped 101 and 102 was transferred to the Ulster Folk & Transport Museum.

The RPSI also has some small diesel shunters, including a Ruston from Carlow sugar factory, a planet diesel from Irish Shell and a unilok diesel from the UTA.

Carriages and other stock
In the 2000s, with more rail stringent regulations, the RPSI was forced to acquire rakes of metal bodied carriages for mainline railtours.

Freight wagons and other stock
Whitehead has a collection of historic wagons, including a GNR brakevan named Ivan, restored by their award-winning Youth team, a Guinness van and NCC handcrane and a GSWR ballast hopper and an oil tanker from Irish Shell.

Operations

Railtours
The main work of the society is in securing and maintaining steam rolling stock, with a view to running rail tours and Mulligan, in "One Hundred and Fifty Years of Irish Railways" noted that the RPSI did "sterling work" in the area of organising of such rail tours around the island, following the end of steam as a regular means of service provision on UTA and CIÉ lines.

Films
The RPSI has been able to assist in the provision of suitable rolling stock for train-related scenes in films made on the island of Ireland. The shooting of The First Great Train Robbery in 1978 was an early significant involvement in film making by the RPSI.

Publication
Five Foot Three is the RPSI's house organ. It is published annually

Incidents
On 7 November 2014, an RPSI train chartered by Web Summit blocked a level crossing in Midleton for over 25 minutes. The operation was referred to the Commission for Railway Regulation. The resulting investigation found that the Society had knowingly run a train that was too long for the station's platform and that it would block a level crossing, yet senior IR management overrode their internal safety department by allowing the train to run.

On 7 July 2019, a serious incident occurred at Gorey when No.85 ran out of water and the fusible plug melted in the firebox. The Civil Defense had to cool down the boiler with hoses while the crew were evacuated from the cab and a rescue diesel summoned from Dublin.

See also
 List of heritage railways in Northern Ireland
 List of heritage railways in the Republic of Ireland
 Irish Steam Preservation Society
 Irish Traction Group

References

Footnotes

Notes

Sources

Primary sources

External links

 RPSI website

Engineering preservation societies
Railway societies
All-Ireland organisations
Museums in County Antrim
Railway museums in Northern Ireland
Heritage railways in Northern Ireland
Heritage railways in the Republic of Ireland
1964 establishments in Ireland